The phonology of Japanese features about 15 consonant phonemes, the cross-linguistically typical five-vowel system of , and a relatively simple phonotactic distribution of phonemes allowing few consonant clusters.

Standard Japanese is a pitch-accent language, wherein the position or absence of a pitch drop may determine the meaning of a word:  "chopsticks",  "bridge",  "edge" (see Japanese pitch accent).

Unless otherwise noted, the following describes the standard variety of Japanese based on the Tokyo dialect.

Consonants

Voiceless stops  are slightly aspirated: less aspirated than English stops, but more so than Spanish.
, a remnant of Old Japanese, now occurs almost always medially in compounds, typically as a result of gemination (as in 切符 kippu, 切腹 seppuku or 北方 hoppō) or after  (as in 音符 onpu), and in a few older compounds as a result of the contractions of pronunciations over time (as in 河童 kappa). It occurs initially or medially in onomatopoeia. Some few non-onomatopoeic exceptions where it occurs initially include 風太郎 pūtarō, although as a personal name it's still pronounced Fūtarō. As gairaigo, loanwords of non-Middle-Chinese origin (non-Middle-Chinese Chinese borrowings such as パオズ paozu, ペテン peten as well as borrowings from non-Chinese languages such as パーティ pāti, etc.), enter the language,  is increasingly used in transcription, initially or medially.
Consonants inside parentheses are allophones of other phonemes, at least in native words. In loanwords,  sometimes occur phonemically, outside of the allophonic variation described below.
Geminate  is now only found in recent loanwords (e.g. Gohho  '(van) Gogh', Bahha  'Bach') and rarely in Sino-Japanese or mixed compounds (e.g. juhhari  'ten stitches', zeffuchō  'terrible slump').
 is a syllable-final moraic nasal with variable pronunciation depending on what follows.
Realization of the liquid phoneme  varies greatly depending on environment and dialect. The prototypical and most common pronunciation is an apical tap, either alveolar  or postalveolar . Utterance-initially and after , the tap is typically articulated in such a way that the tip of the tongue is at first momentarily in light contact with the alveolar ridge before being released rapidly by airflow. This sound is described variably as a tap, a "variant of ", "a kind of weak plosive", and "an affricate with short friction, ". The apical alveolar or postalveolar lateral approximant  is a common variant in all conditions, particularly utterance-initially and before . The retroflex lateral approximant  is also found before . In Tokyo's Shitamachi dialect, the alveolar trill  is a variant marked with vulgarity. Other reported variants include the alveolar approximant , the alveolar stop , the retroflex flap , the lateral fricative , and the retroflex stop .

Weakening
Non-coronal voiced stops  between vowels may be weakened to fricatives, especially in fast or casual speech:

{| cellpadding="3"
|  > bilabial fricative :
|  >  abareru  'to behave violently'
|-
|  > velar fricative :
|  >  hage  'baldness'
|}

However,  is further complicated by its variant realization as a velar nasal . Standard Japanese speakers can be categorized into 3 groups (A, B, C), which will be explained below. If a speaker pronounces a given word consistently with the allophone  (i.e., a B-speaker), that speaker will never have  as an allophone in that same word.

 may be weakened to nasal  when it occurs within words—this includes not only between vowels but also between a vowel and a consonant. There is a fair amount of variation between speakers, however.  suggests that the variation follows social class, while  suggests that the variation follows age and geographic location. The generalized situation is as follows.

At the beginning of words
 all present-day standard Japanese speakers generally use the stop  at the beginning of words:  >  gaiyū  'overseas trip' (but not )

In the middle of simple words (i.e. non-compounds)
 B. a minority of speakers consistently use :  >  (but not )
 C. most speakers in western Japan and a smaller minority of speakers in Kantō consistently use :  >  (but not )

In the middle of compound words morpheme-initially:
 B-speakers mentioned directly above consistently use .

So, for some speakers the following two words are a minimal pair while for others they are homophonous:

 sengo  (せんご) 'one thousand and five' =  for B-speakers
 sengo  'postwar' =  for B-speakers

To summarize using the example of hage  'baldness':

 B-speakers:  > 
 C-speakers:  >  or 

Some phonologists posit a distinct phoneme , citing pairs such as   'big sheet of glass' vs.   'big raven'.

Palatalization and affrication
The palatals  and  palatalize the consonants preceding them:

{| cellpadding="3"
|  > palatalized :
|  >  umi  'sea'
|-
|  > palatalized :
|  >  gyōza  'fried dumpling'
|-
| > palatalized 
| >  kiri  'cut'
|-
| etc.
|
|}

For coronal consonants, the palatalization goes further so that alveolo-palatal consonants correspond with dental or alveolar consonants ( 'field' vs.  'tea'):

{| cellpadding="3"
|  > Alveolo-palatal nasal :
|  >  nihon  'Japan'
|-
|  > alveolo-palatal fricative :
|  >  shio  'salt'
|-
| style="vertical-align: top;" |  > alveolo-palatal  or :
|  >  jishin  'earthquake'; >  ~  gojū  'fifty'
|-
|  > alveolo-palatal affricate :
|  >  ~  chijin  'acquaintance'
|}

 and  also palatalize  to a palatal fricative:  >  hito  ('person')

Both sounds, however, are in free variation.

In modern Japanese, this is arguably a separate phoneme, at least for the portion of the population that pronounces it distinctly in English borrowings.

{| cellpadding="4"
|  >  (romanized as sh):
|  >  shabon  'soap'
|-
|  >  (romanized as j):
|  >  jagaimo  'potato'
|-
|  >  (romanized as ch):
|  >  cha  'tea'
|-
|  >  (romanized as hy):
|  >  hyaku  'hundred'
|}

The vowel  also affects consonants that it follows:

{| cellpadding="3"
|  > bilabial fricative :
|  >  futa  'lid'
|-
|  > dental affricate :
|  >  tsugi  'next'
|}

English hood vs. food >  fūdo ). Similarly,  and  usually do not occur even in loanwords so that English cinema becomes  shinema ; although they may be written  and  respectively, they are rarely found even among the most innovative speakers and do not occur phonemically.

neutralization

Moraic nasal
Some analyses of Japanese treat the moraic nasal as an archiphoneme ; other less abstract approaches take its uvular or alveolar realization as basic (i.e.,  or ). It undergoes a variety of assimilatory processes. It is variously:

 bilabial  before .
 laminal  before coronals ; never found utterance-finally. Apical  is found before liquid .
 alveolo-palatal  before alveolo-palatals .
 velar  before .
 some sort of nasalized vowel before vowels, approximants , liquid , and fricatives . Depending on context and speaker, the vowel's quality may closely match that of the preceding vowel or be more constricted in articulation. It is also found utterance-finally.

These assimilations occur beyond word boundaries.

When utterance-final, the moraic nasal is traditionally described as uvular , sometimes with qualification that the occlusion may not always be complete or that it is, or approaches, velar  after front vowels. However, instrumental studies in the 2010s showed that there is considerable variability in the realization of utterance-final  and that it often involves a lip closure or constriction. A 2021 real-time MRI study found that the tongue position of utterance-final  largely corresponds to that of the preceding vowel, though with overlapping locations, leading the researcher to conclude that  has no specified place of articulation rather than a clear allophonic rule. 5% of the samples of utterance-final  were realized as nasalized vowels with no closure, where appreciable tongue raising was observed only when following .

Gemination
While Japanese features consonant gemination, there are some limitations in what can be geminated. Most saliently, voiced geminates are prohibited in native Japanese words. This can be seen with suffixation that would otherwise feature voiced geminates. For example, Japanese has a suffix, || that contains what  calls a "floating mora" that triggers gemination in certain cases (e.g. || +|| >  'a lot of'). When this would otherwise lead to a geminated voiced obstruent, a moraic nasal appears instead as a sort of "partial gemination" (e.g. || + || >  'splashing').

In the late 20th century, voiced geminates began to appear in loanwords, though they are marked and have a high tendency to be devoiced.  A frequent example is loanwords from English such as bed and dog that, though they end with voiced singletons in English, are geminated (with an epenthetic vowel) when borrowed into Japanese.  These geminates frequently undergo devoicing to become less marked, which gives rise to variability in voicing:
 doggu  → dokku  ('dog')
 beddo  → betto  ('bed')

The distinction is not rigorous. For example, when voiced obstruent geminates appear with another voiced obstruent they can undergo optional devoicing (e.g. doreddo ~ doretto 'dreadlocks').  attributes this to a less reliable distinction between voiced and voiceless geminates compared to the same distinction in non-geminated consonants, noting that speakers may have difficulty distinguishing them due to the partial devoicing of voiced geminates and their resistance to the weakening process mentioned above, both of which can make them sound like voiceless geminates.

There is some dispute about how gemination fits with Japanese phonotactics. One analysis, particularly popular among Japanese scholars, posits a special "mora phoneme" ( Mōra onso) , which corresponds to the sokuon . However, not all scholars agree that the use of this "moraic obstruent" is the best analysis. In those approaches that incorporate the moraic obstruent, it is said to completely assimilate to the following obstruent, resulting in a geminate (that is, double) consonant. The assimilated  remains unreleased and thus the geminates are phonetically long consonants.  does not occur before vowels or nasal consonants. This can be seen as an archiphoneme in that it has no underlying place or manner of articulation, and instead manifests as several phonetic realizations depending on context, for example:

{| cellpadding="3"
|  before :
|  >  nippon  'Japan'
|-
|  before :
|  >  kassen  'battle'
|-
|  before :
|  >  satchi  'inference'
|-
| etc.
|}

In such an approach, the words above are phonemicized as shown below:

{| cellpadding="3"
|  before :
|  >  nippon  'Japan'
|-
|  before :
|  >  kassen  'battle'
|-
|  before :
|  >  satchi  'inference'
|-
| etc.
|}

Gemination can of course also be transcribed with a length mark (e.g. ), but this notation obscures mora boundaries.

Sandhi
In some cases, such as this example, the sound change is used in writing as well, and is considered the usual pronunciation. See  (in Japanese) for further examples.

Vowels

  is a close near-back vowel with the lips unrounded or compressed. When compressed, it is pronounced with the side portions of the lips in contact but with no salient protrusion. In conversational speech, compression may be weakened or completely dropped. It is centralized  after  and palatalized consonants, and possibly also after .
  are mid .
  is central .

Vowels have a phonemic length contrast (i.e. short vs. long). Compare contrasting pairs of words like ojisan  'uncle' vs. ojiisan  'grandfather', or tsuki  'moon' vs. tsūki  'airflow'.

Some analyses make a distinction between a long vowel and a succession of two identical vowels, citing pairs such as  satōya 'sugar shop'  vs.  satooya 'foster parent' . They are usually identical in normal speech, but when enunciated a distinction may be made with a pause or a glottal stop inserted between two identical vowels.

Within words and phrases, Japanese allows long sequences of phonetic vowels without intervening consonants, pronounced with hiatus, although the pitch accent and slight rhythm breaks help track the timing when the vowels are identical. Sequences of two vowels within a single word are extremely common, occurring at the end of many i-type adjectives, for example, and having three or more vowels in sequence within a word also occurs, as in aoi 'blue/green'. In phrases, sequences with multiple o sounds are most common, due to the direct object particle  'wo' (which comes after a word) being realized as o and the honorific prefix  'o', which can occur in sequence, and may follow a word itself terminating in an o sound; these may be dropped in rapid speech. A fairly common construction exhibiting these is  ... (w)o o-okuri-shimasu 'humbly send ...'. More extreme examples follow:

{| cellpadding="3"
|  
| hōō o oō
| 'let's chase the fenghuang'
|-
|  
| tōō o ōō
| 'let's cover Eastern Europe'
|}

Devoicing

In many dialects, the close vowels  and  become voiceless when placed between two voiceless consonants or, unless accented, between a voiceless consonant and a pausa.

{| cellpadding="3"
|  > 
| kutsu  'shoe'
|-
|  > 
| atsu  'pressure'
|-
|  > 
| hikan  'pessimism'
|}

Generally, devoicing does not occur in a consecutive manner:

{| cellpadding="3"
|  > 
| kishitsu  'temperament'
|-
|  > 
| kushikumo  'strangely'
|}

This devoicing is not restricted to only fast speech, though consecutive devoicing may occur in fast speech.

To a lesser extent,  may be devoiced with the further requirement that there be two or more adjacent moras containing the same phoneme:

{| cellpadding="3"
|  > 
| kokoro  'heart'
|-
|  > 
| haka  'grave'
|}

Japanese speakers are usually not even aware of the difference of the voiced and devoiced pair. On the other hand, gender roles play a part in prolonging the terminal vowel: it is regarded as effeminate to prolong, particularly the terminal  as in arimasu. Some nonstandard varieties of Japanese can be recognized by their hyper-devoicing, while in some Western dialects and some registers of formal speech, every vowel is voiced. Recent research has argued that "vowel deletion" more accurately describes the phenomena.

However, Japanese contrasts devoiced vowel between two identical voiceless fricatives and voiceless fricative gemination. Vowel between two identical voiceless fricatives may have either a weak voiceless approximant release or a revoiced vowel depending on the rate of speech and individual speech habits.

Nasalization
Japanese vowels are slightly nasalized when adjacent to nasals . Before the moraic nasal , vowels are heavily nasalized:

{| cellpadding="3"
| > 
|Kantō  'Kanto region'
|-
|  > 
| seisan  'production'
|}

Glottal stop insertion
At the beginning and end of utterances, Japanese vowels may be preceded and followed by a glottal stop , respectively. This is demonstrated below with the following words (as pronounced in isolation):

{| cellpadding="3"
|  >  ~ :
| en  'yen'
|-
|  > :
| kishi  'shore'
|-
|  > :
| u  'cormorant'
|}

When an utterance-final word is uttered with emphasis, this glottal stop is plainly audible, and is often indicated in the writing system with a small letter tsu  called a sokuon.

Phonotactics

Japanese words have traditionally been analysed as composed of moras, a distinct concept from that of syllables. Each mora occupies one rhythmic unit, i.e. it is perceived to have the same time value. A glide  may precede the vowel in "regular" moras (CjV). Some analyses posit a third "special" mora, the second part of a long vowel (a chroneme). In this table, the period represents a mora break, rather than the conventional syllable break.

{| border="0" cellspacing="3" cellpadding="4"
| Mora type
| Example
| Japanese
| Moras per word
|-
| V
| 
| o  'tail'
| 1-mora word
|-
| jV
| 
| yo  'world'
| 1-mora word
|-
| CV
| 
| ko  'child'
| 1-mora word
|-
| CjV
| 
| kyo  'hugeness'
| 1-mora word
|-
| R
| kyō  'today'
| 2-mora word
|-
| N
|  in 
| kon  'deep blue'
| 2-mora word
|-
| Q
| kokko  'national treasury'
| 3-mora word
|}

 Traditionally, moras were divided into plain and palatal sets, the latter of which entail palatalization of the consonant element.

Vowels may be long, and the voiceless consonants  may be geminated (doubled). In the analysis with archiphonemes, geminate consonants are the realization of the sequences ,  and sequences of  followed by a voiceless obstruent, though some words are written with geminate voiced obstruents. In the analysis without archiphonemes, geminate clusters are simply two identical consonants, one after the other.

In English, stressed syllables in a word are pronounced louder, longer, and with higher pitch, while unstressed syllables are relatively shorter in duration. Japanese is often considered a mora-timed language, as each mora tends to be of the same length, though not strictly: geminate consonants and moras with devoiced vowels may be shorter than other moras.  Factors such as pitch have negligible influence on mora length.

Accent

Standard Japanese has a distinctive pitch accent system: a word can have one of its moras bearing an accent or not. An accented mora is pronounced with a relatively high tone and is followed by a drop in pitch. The various Japanese dialects have different accent patterns, and some exhibit more complex tonic systems.

Sound change
As an agglutinative language, Japanese has generally very regular pronunciation, with much simpler morphophonology than a fusional language would. Nevertheless, there are a number of prominent sound change phenomena, primarily in morpheme combination and in conjugation of verbs and adjectives. Phonemic changes are generally reflected in the spelling, while those that are not either indicate informal or dialectal speech which further simplify pronunciation.

Sandhi

Rendaku

In Japanese, sandhi is prominently exhibited in rendaku – consonant mutation of the initial consonant of a morpheme from unvoiced to voiced in some contexts when it occurs in the middle of a word.

Gemination
So that 
  (いつ itsu) +  (しょ sho) =  (いっしょ issho)
  (gaku) +  (kō) =  (gakkō)

Some long vowels derive from an earlier combination of a vowel and fu ふ (see onbin). The f often causes gemination when it is joined with another word:
  (hafu はふ > hō ほう) +  (hi ひ) =  (happi はっぴ), instead of hōhi ほうひ
  (kafu かふ > gō ごう) +  (sen せん) =  (kassen), instead of gōsen
  (nifu > nyū) +  (shō) =  (nisshō), instead of nyūshō
  (jifu > jū) +  (kai) =  (jikkai) instead of jūkai

MC * > Japanese  ).

Renjō

Examples:

First syllable ending with 
 (ginnan):  (gin) +  (an) →  (ginnan)
 (kannon):  (kwan) +  (om) →  (kwannom) →  (kannon) 
 (tennō):  (ten) +  (wau) →  (tennau) →  (tennō)
 (sanmi):  (sam) +  (wi) →  (sammi) →  (sanmi) 
 (onmyō):  (om) +  (yau) →  (ommyau) →  (onmyō)
First syllable ending with 
 (setchin):  (setsu) +  (in) →  (setchin)
 (kuttaku):  (kutsu) +  (waku) →  (kuttaku)

Onbin
1. usually not reflected in spelling

However, certain forms are still recognizable as irregular morphology, particularly forms that occur in basic verb conjugation, as well as some compound words.

Verb conjugation

Polite adjective forms

The polite adjective forms (used before the polite copula  and verb ) exhibit a one-step or two-step sound change. Firstly, these use the continuative form, which exhibits onbin, dropping the k as  → . Secondly, the vowel may combine with the preceding vowel, according to historical sound changes; if the resulting new sound is palatalized, meaning , this combines with the preceding consonant, yielding a palatalized syllable.

This is most prominent in certain everyday terms that derive from an i-adjective ending in -ai changing to -ō (-ou), which is because these terms are abbreviations of polite phrases ending in gozaimasu, sometimes with a polite o- prefix. The terms are also used in their full form, with notable examples being:

Other transforms of this type are found in polite speech, such as  →  and  → .

-hito
These include:

 , from  →  → .
 , from  →  → .
 , from  →  → .
 , from  →  → .
 , from  →  →  → .
 , from  →  →  → .
 , from  →  →  → .

Fusion
In some cases morphemes have effectively fused and will not be recognizable as being composed of two separate morphemes.

See also

 
 Japanese grammar
 Japanese writing system
 Japanese honorifics
 Japanese language and computers
 Japanese language education
 Japanese literature
 Transcription into Japanese
 Yotsugana, the different distinctions of historical *zi, *di, *zu, *du in different regions of Japan
 Okinawan Japanese, a variant of Standard Japanese influenced by the Ryukyuan languages 
 Japanese loanwords in Hawaii

Notes

References

Further reading
 
 
 
 
 

 
 
 
 
 
 
 
 

 
Phonologies by language